Nakisa Levale (born 12 March 1997) is a Canadian rugby sevens player. She was named in Canada's sevens team and competed at the 2022 Commonwealth Games in Birmingham. Her side lost to New Zealand in the bronze medal match and finished fourth overall.

Levale competed for Canada at the 2022 Rugby World Cup Sevens in Cape Town. They placed sixth overall after losing to Fiji in the fifth place final.

References 

1997 births
Living people
Female rugby sevens players
Canada international women's rugby sevens players
20th-century Canadian women
21st-century Canadian women
Rugby sevens players at the 2022 Commonwealth Games